The Ford Tennis Championships was a tennis tournament held annually in Louisville, Kentucky from 2006 to 2008. The event was part of the ''challenger series and was played on indoor hard courts.

Past finals

Singles

Doubles

Defunct tennis tournaments in the United States
Hard court tennis tournaments in the United States
ATP Challenger Tour
Sports competitions in Louisville, Kentucky
Tennis in Kentucky
Recurring sporting events established in 2006
Recurring sporting events disestablished in 2008
2006 establishments in Kentucky
2008 disestablishments in Kentucky